Jorge Tavares may refer to:
Jorge Tavares (footballer, born 1905), Portuguese footballer
Jorge Tavares (footballer, born 1986), Portuguese footballer